99 Hudson is a 79-story condominium in Jersey City, New Jersey. It is the tallest building in Jersey City and the state of New Jersey, and the 46th tallest building in the United States. It is also the tallest residential building in the United States outside of New York City and Chicago. Developed by China Overseas America (the U.S. arm of the Hong Kong-based company COHL), 99 Hudson is the first residential project in the U.S. for the firm. The 1.4 million square-foot building will include 781 condominium units ranging from studios to three bedrooms.

History
Plans for the development were first released in March 2014. Originally, the plans called for twin towers, but after the land changed hands, the plans were changed to a single,  tower. The building was approved in early 2015 by the city.

Ground was broken on January 29, 2016. The building topped-out in September 2018.

Architectural details 
The building is a 79-story, 900 ft (274 m) tall residential skyscraper. The building takes up an entire city block in downtown. It has a porte-cochere entrance, where the lobby is located, as well as the entrance to the parking garage. The building has a limestone and glass facade, echoing to Art Deco Style. The building contains three open plazas, and a residential rooftop garden above an eight-story podium. Along the sidewalk, there are storefronts with large windows between limestone piers. At night, lighting features on the piers light up.

Usage
The building is residential and includes 781 condominiums. A penthouse, located on the 76th floor,  sold in November 2021 for $4.4385 million, making it the highest priced residential condominium closing in Jersey City history. Another 2,500 square-foot residence, a lower level penthouse on the 75th floor, includes 1,167 square-feet of private outdoor space. There is 65,000 sq ft of indoor and outdoor amenities. This includes a fitness center, yoga studio, Pilates studio, and an entertainment game center which includes card rooms, pool, Foosball tables, a golf simulator, a children's playroom, a demonstration kitchen, work cafe, and a screening room with a bar. The rooftop contains a garden. There is a 24-hour concierge. Residents have an exclusive spa, which includes a hot tub, wet and dry lounges, steam room, dry sauna, showers, spa terrace and private massages. The 8th floor contains an amenity deck, which contains a 3,000 sq ft swimming pool, private cabanas, indoor and outdoor lounges, and a dining area with BBQ grills, a playground, dog run, and a green lawn. Pedestrian plazas and open spaces are an additional 7,500 sq ft.

See also
 List of tallest buildings in New Jersey
 List of tallest buildings in Jersey City
 List of tallest buildings in the United States
 List of tallest residential buildings

References

Skyscrapers in Jersey City, New Jersey
Skyscrapers in New Jersey
Residential buildings in New Jersey
Residential skyscrapers in New Jersey